The men's freestyle 58 kilograms is a competition featured at the 1998 World Wrestling Championships, and was held at the Azadi Indoor Stadium in Tehran, Iran from 9 to 11 September 1998.

Results

Round 1

Round 2

Round 3

Round 4

Round 5

Round 6

Round 7

Finals

References

External links
UWW Database

Men's freestyle 58 kg